Fu Quanyou (born November 1930) is a general of the People's Republic of China.

Biography 
Fu was born in Guo County (now Yuanping), Shanxi in 1930. He joined the People's Liberation Army in October 1946, and the Chinese Communist Party in August 1947.

He joined the Chinese People's Volunteer Army in February 1953 and fought in Korea until October 1958 when he returned to China. In 1960 he graduated from the PLA's higher military academy. He became the commander of Chengdu Military Region in June 1985, and the commander of Lanzhou Military Region in May 1990. He was a member of 12th - 15th CCP central committees, and a delegate in the 8th and 9th National People's Congress. He was made lieutenant general (zhongjiang) in 1988 and general (shangjiang) in 1993. From October 1992 to September 1995, he was the director of the General Logistics Department of the PLA. He was promoted to the head of General Staff Department of the PLA in September 1995.

Fu was a member of the Central Military Commission from October 1992 until his retirement in March 2003.

References

1930 births
Living people
People from Yuanping
People from Xinzhou
People's Liberation Army generals from Shanxi
People's Liberation Army Chiefs of General Staff
Members of the 12th Central Committee of the Chinese Communist Party
Members of the 13th Central Committee of the Chinese Communist Party
Members of the 14th Central Committee of the Chinese Communist Party
Members of the 15th Central Committee of the Chinese Communist Party
Delegates to the 8th National People's Congress
Delegates to the 9th National People's Congress